Combat avec l'ange (Struggle with the Angel) is a novel by French playwright and novelist Jean Giraudoux and published by éditions Grasset in 1934.

External links
 Giraudoux, Jean, Combat avec l'Ange, French & European Pubns, October 1, 1934, 

Novels by Jean Giraudoux
1934 French novels
Éditions Grasset books